Isomorphism problem may refer to:

 graph isomorphism problem
 group isomorphism problem